Köýtendag District   (formerly Çarşaňňy District) is a district of Lebap Province in Turkmenistan. The administrative center of the district is the city of Köýtendag.

History
Formed in August 1926 as Charshangi in the then-region of Kerkin, it came under direct control of the Turkmen SSR government in November 1930, when the aforementioned district was abolished. The region was restored back in February 1933, of which this district was once again a part of. In November 1939, it became part of the newly-formed region of Chardzhou (now Lebap).

December 1943 saw the reincorporation of this district into the district of Kerkin, and in January 1947 this district became part of Chardzhou once again.

This district was abolished in January 1963, but was reestablished in December 1964, of which it came under direct control of the central government of the Turkmen SSR at Ashgabat. When Chardzhou was reestablished again in 1970, it again became part of it.

In 1992, this district was incorporated into the newly-formed Lebap region; its name was first renamed into its Turkmenized form, Çarşaňňy, before being renamed into Köýtendag, as it is known today.

Nature reserve
The district contains the Köýtendag Nature Reserve which was established in 1986. It is located in the Köýtendag Range of the district and covers an area of 271.4 km2. The district is also the site of the "Dinosaur Plateau", a prehistoric mudflow which preserves 160-million-year-old footprints of dinosaurs.

Districts of Turkmenistan
Lebap Region